The Alatau cattle (also Ala Tau) are a breed of cattle of, Kazakh SSR (USSR), named after the Alatau (Turkic "Motley Mountain") Mountains.

Ala Tau cattle are used for beef and dairy production.

External links
 http://www.fao.org/docrep/009/ah759e/AH759E08.htm

Cattle breeds originating in Kazakhstan
Cattle breeds